David Sands is an animal psychologist, author and television presenter based in Chorley, Lancashire.

Sands is primarily a human-companion animal practitioner at the Animal Behavioural Clinic in Chorley, Lancashire, specialising in the treatment of behavioural problems displayed by dogs, cats, birds, horses and exotic animals. Sands produces behaviour-modification programs and has appeared several times as an expert witness in court cases all over the country related to the Dangerous Dogs Act, and associated aggression and emotional behaviours.

He is also an internationally established animal-related author and photographer, researching ‘human psychology’ and zoology.

Television 
David regularly contributes and advises various UK and radio news programmes on related human and pet companionship subjects.

References

External links 
 problempets.co.uk
 

English television presenters
Living people
Year of birth missing (living people)